Paremhat 11 - Coptic Calendar - Paremhat 13

The twelfth day of the Coptic month of Paremhat, the seventh month of the Coptic year. In common years, this day corresponds to March 8, of the Julian Calendar, and March 21, of the Gregorian Calendar. This day falls in the Coptic Season of Shemu, the season of the Harvest.

Commemorations

Heavenly Orders 

 Monthly commemoration of Archangel Michael

Martyrs 

 Martyrdom of Saint Malachias of Palestine 
 Martyrdom of Saint Glathinos in Damascus

Saints 

 Departure of Saint Bishoy Kamel, the Hegumen

Other commemorations 

 Commemoration of the revealing of the Virginity of Pope Demetrius I, the 12th Patriarch of the see of Saint Mark

References 

Days of the Coptic calendar